Jamoi Wade Topey (born 13 January 2000) is a Jamaican footballer who plays as a defender for Cavalier.

Career

Club 

Topey played for Camperdown High School in the Manning Cup during his schoolboy career. After two seasons with top flight Jamaica National Premier League side Cavalier, Topey moved on loan to USL Championship side Bethlehem Steel  on 1 March 2019. In December 2020, Philadelphia Union decline the club option and released Topey.

In 2021, Topey returned back to his former club Cavalier F.C. in the Jamaica Premier League and helped them to win the 2021 title.

International 

Topey has featured for Jamaica at the u17 and u20 levels. In March 2019, Topey was called to the senior national team. Topey made his senior international debut on 26 March 2019 versus Costa Rica.

In July 2019, Topey also featured for the Jamaica u23 olympic team.

Career Statistics

Honors

 Winner (1): Jamaica Premier League

References

External links 
 

2000 births
Living people
Jamaican footballers
Jamaica youth international footballers
Jamaica under-20 international footballers
Jamaica international footballers
Jamaican expatriate footballers
Philadelphia Union II players
Association football defenders
USL Championship players
Jamaican expatriate sportspeople in the United States
Expatriate soccer players in the United States
People from Saint Catherine Parish
2019 CONCACAF Gold Cup players